On n'enferme pas les oiseaux is the debut studio album by French singer-songwriter Barbara Pravi. It was released on 27 August 2021 by Capitol Music France. Following the release of three extended plays and her representation in the Eurovision Song Contest 2021 with the song "Voilà", Pravi began working on a full-length album as her next work. The record's title comes from a lyric found in the song "L'homme et l'oiseau", which she stated is "because nothing is more majestic than the spreading of one's own wings". On n'enferme pas les oiseaux is a French pop and chanson album that explores themes of love, feminism and self-affirmation.

Background and release
After releasing singles and an extended play with Jules Jaconelli on Capitol Music France in 2017, Pravi switched direction to French chanson music, which was 'more to her own taste'.

In 2021, Pravi's song "Voilà", composed alongside Igit and Lili Poe, was chosen to represent France in the Eurovision Song Contest 2021 in Rotterdam. She finished in second place, scoring 499 points, thereby achieving France's best Eurovision result since . 

Following the contest, Pravi continued to work with Élodie Filleul and Jérémie Arcache on her debut full-length album, continuing to write with Chung, Igit and Poe, who co-wrote "Voilà", as well as Vincha and Arcache. Two further music videos were released after "Voilà", to create a triptych of videos before the album's release; "Le jour se lève" and "L'homme et l'oiseau". The album was released on 27 August 2021 on CD and digital download, and 8 October 2021 on vinyl.

Critical reception

The album was met with critical acclaim upon release. Jeremy Williams-Chalmers of The Yorkshire Times highlighted its distinct sound, concluding that the record "is a stunning collection that showcases an artist comfortable in her own skin and ready to explore many musical terrains." Martin Leitch in a Gigwise vinyl review of the album praised Pravi's songwriting and lyricism, adding that "On n'enferme pas les oiseaux boasts the compulsive immediacy of all the best pop, whilst managing in the same breath to command a certain distinguished subtlety that sets Pravi out as an artist with a clear creative vision."

Track listing
Credits adapted from the album's liner notes.

Charts

References

2021 albums
Pop albums by French artists
Chanson albums